Sam Marks is an American North American champion bridge player and an American Contract Bridge League (ACBL) Grand Life Master.

Bridge accomplishments

Wins
 North American Bridge Championships (1)
 Grand National Teams (1) 2022

Runners-up
 North American Bridge Championships (1)
 Wernher Open Pairs (1) 2005

Personal life
Sam lives in Atlanta with his wife, Lisa. Sam owns and runs the Bridge Club of Atlanta.

References

American contract bridge players
Living people
Year of birth missing (living people)